Spiridon Brusina (11 December 1845 – 21 May 1909) was a Croatian malacologist.

Together with Oton Kučera and Gjuro Pilar, he founded the Croatian Society of Natural Sciences in Zagreb in the late 1885.

Taxa described 
 Drobacia Brusina, 1904
 Emmericia Brusina, 1870
 Erjavecia Brusina, 1870
 Manzonia Brusina, 1870
 Spelaeodiscus Brusina, 1886
 Vidovicia Brusina, 1904
 Trochulus erjaveci (Brusina, 1870)

Bibliography 

 Brusina S. (1865). "Conchiglie Dalmate Inedite", Wien
 Brusina S. (1866). "Contribuzione pella fauna dei molluschi Dalmati". Wien
 Brusina S. (1869)."Gasteropodes noveaux de l'Adriatique" in J. de Conchyl. XVII
 Brusina S. (1870)."Principi Malacologici", Zagreb
 Brusina S. (1870). Ipsa Chierrenghinii Conchiglie, Pisa
 Brusina S. (1870). "Saggio della Malacologia Adriatica" in Boll. Soc. Malac. Ital. VI
 Brusina S. (1870). "Monographie der Gattungen Emmericia und Fossarulus". Verhandlungen der kaiserlich-königlichen Zoologisch-Botanischen Gesellschaft in Wien 20: 925–938.
 Brusina S. (1872). "Saggio secundo della Malacologia Adriatica", Ebenda
 Brusina S. (1886). "Ueber die Mollusken-Fauna Oesterreich-Ungarns". Mittheilungen des Naturwissenschaftlichen Vereins für Steiermark 22(1885): 29–56. Graz.
 Brusina S. (1904). "Zur Rettung unserer Mollusken-Fauna". Nachrichtsblatt der Deutschen Malakozoologischen Gesellschaft 36: 157-168.

References 

1845 births
1909 deaths
Croatian malacologists
Croatian scientists
Members of the Croatian Academy of Sciences and Arts
Burials at Mirogoj Cemetery
19th-century Croatian scientists
20th-century Croatian scientists